Haloclava is a genus of sea anemones in the family Haloclavidae. Members of this genus typically burrow into soft sediment.

Species
The following species are listed by the World Register of Marine Species:

Haloclava brevicornis (Stimpson, 1856)
Haloclava capensis (Verrill, 1865)
Haloclava chinensis Carlgren, 1931
Haloclava producta (Stimpson, 1856)
Haloclava stimpsoni (Verrill, 1868)

References

Haloclavidae
Hexacorallia genera